Szebnie  is a village in the administrative district of Gmina Jasło, within Jasło County, Subcarpathian Voivodeship, in south-eastern Poland.

World War II
The town was the location of the Szebnie concentration camp during German occupation of Poland in World War II. The facility was constructed in 1940 originally as horse stables for the Wehrmacht next to a manorial estate. Thousands of prisoners perished there over the course of the camp's operation, including Russian prisoners of war, Polish Jews and non-Jewish Poles as well as Ukrainians and Romani people. The charred remains of the camp were entered by the Soviets on 8 September 1944.

There was a SS training facility SS-Truppenübungsplatz Heidelager nearby at Pustków, for the Ukrainian 14th Waffen SS Division, as well as other collaborationists military formations. Their field training included killing operations at Szebnie.

See also
 The Holocaust in Poland

References

Szebnie
Holocaust locations in Poland